Falsiporphyromonas endometrii  is an anaerobic bacterium from the genus of Falsiporphyromonas which has been isolated from the post-partum bovine uterus of a holstein cow in Klein Bennebek in Germany.

References

External links
Type strain of Falsiporphyromonas endometrii at BacDive -  the Bacterial Diversity Metadatabase

Bacteroidia
Bacteria described in 2014